United Pentecostal Church is a major Christian denomination in India belonging to the United Pentecostal Church International. Its seat is Bangalore. It was established in the mid-20th century. After sometime, out of the United Pentecostal Church of India, the United Pentecostal Church of Northeast India Unit was formed because of the vast areas and cultural differences. But both units are still under the  Global Missions of United Pentecostal Church whose Headquarters is at the United States of America. It believes that the Bible is infallible.

References

See also 
Adivasi
Christianity in India

Pentecostalism in India
Oneness Pentecostal denominations
Pentecostal denominations in Asia